Multiple ships of the United States Navy have been named USS Newark, after the city of Newark, New Jersey.

  was a protected cruiser in service from 1891 to 1912.
  was a minesweeper and tug in commission from 1917 to 1919.
  was a planned  light cruiser; construction was cancelled in 1940.
  was a Cleveland-class light cruiser that was converted during construction to the  light aircraft carrier .
  was a planned  light cruiser; construction was cancelled in 1945.

United States Navy ship names